France Marguerite Ellegaard (10 October 1913 – 17 April 1999) was a Finnish pianist and music educator, born in France to Danish parents. She was considered one of the 20th century's great concert pianists.

The daughter of cyclist Thorvald Ellegaard and Karen Kirstine Nicolaysen, she was born in Paris. Ellegaard studied at the Paris Conservatory and gave her first Danish performance in Copenhagen in 1927. She performed throughout Scandinavia and in the music capitals of Europe. Following the German invasion of Denmark in 1940, she remained in Denmark and then, in 1943, went to Sweden as a political refugee. She married Finnish painter Birger Carlstedt in 1949 and became a Finnish citizen.

Ellegaard received a medal from the French  in 1933. She received the Danish Tagea Brandt Rejselegat (travel scholarship) in 1936.

From 1969 to 1975, Ellegaard taught piano at the Sibelius Academy.

She died at Espoo in Finland.

References 

1913 births
1999 deaths
Danish classical pianists
Danish women pianists
Finnish classical pianists
Finnish women pianists
Finnish music educators
Finnish people of Danish descent
20th-century classical pianists
Women music educators
Women classical pianists
Danish expatriates in Sweden
Danish emigrants to Finland
Naturalized citizens of Finland
Danish expatriates in France
20th-century women pianists